The 2017–18 season was Hamilton Academical's fourth consecutive season in the top flight of Scottish football since their promotion at the end of the 2013–14 season. Hamilton also competed in the League Cup and the Scottish Cup.

Summary

Season

Hamilton finished in tenth place in the Scottish Premiership and only avoided the relegation play-off place on the final day of the season due to goal difference with Partick Thistle's victory over Dundee. Hamilton also reached the second round of the league cup and the fourth round of the Scottish Cup.

Results and fixtures

Scottish Premiership

Scottish League Cup

Group stage
Results

Knockout stage

Scottish Cup

Squad statistics

Appearances
 

|-
|colspan="14"|Players who left the club during the 2017–18 season
|-

|-
|}

Team Statistics

League table

Division summary

League Cup Table

Transfers

In

Out

References

Hamilton Academical F.C. seasons
Hamilton Academical